Uluköy is a village in the Kurtalan District of Siirt Province in Turkey. The village is populated by Kurds of the Babosî tribe and had a population of 497 in 2021.

The hamlet of Gümüşsu is attached to Uluköy.

References 

Kurdish settlements in Siirt Province
Villages in Kurtalan District